Heather Michele O'Rourke (December 27, 1975 – February 1, 1988) was an American child actress. She had her breakthrough starring as Carol Anne Freeling in the supernatural horror film Poltergeist (1982), which received critical acclaim and established her as an influential figure in the genre. She went on to reprise the role in Poltergeist II: The Other Side (1986) and Poltergeist III (1988), the latter of which was released posthumously.

O'Rourke also worked in television, appearing in the recurring roles of Heather Pfister on the comedy series Happy Days (1982–1983) and Melanie in the sitcom Webster (1983), as well as starring as Sarah Brogan in the television-film Surviving: A Family in Crisis (1985).

Throughout her career, O'Rourke was nominated for six Young Artist Awards, winning once for her role in Webster. On February 1, 1988, O'Rourke died following two cardiac arrests, her cause of death later being ruled as congenital stenosis of the intestine complicated by septic shock.

Early life
Heather Michele O'Rourke was born on December 27, 1975, in San Diego, to Kathleen and Michael O'Rourke. Her mother worked as a seamstress and her father was a carpenter. She had an older sister, Tammy O'Rourke, also an actress. Her parents divorced in 1981, and O'Rourke's mother married part-time truck driver Jim Peele in 1984, while they were living in a trailer park in Anaheim, California. Her success later allowed the family to purchase a home in Big Bear Lake, California. Between acting jobs, O'Rourke attended Big Bear Elementary School, where she was president of her 5th grade class. At the time of her death, the family was living in Lakeside, California, a suburb of San Diego.

Acting career 
In a contemporary interview with American Premiere magazine, producer Steven Spielberg explained that he was looking for a "beatific four-year-old child...every mother's dream" for the lead in his horror film Poltergeist (1982). While eating in the MGM commissary, Spielberg saw five-year-old O'Rourke having lunch with her mother while older sister Tammy was shooting Pennies from Heaven. After his lunch, Spielberg approached the family and offered O'Rourke the Poltergeist role; she was signed the next day, beating out Drew Barrymore, who instead received the role of Gertie in E.T. the Extra-Terrestrial.

In Poltergeist, O'Rourke played Carol Anne Freeling, a young suburban girl who becomes the conduit and target for supernatural entities. During production, Spielberg twice accommodated the child actress when frightened; when scared by performing a particular stunt, Spielberg replaced O'Rourke with a stunt double wearing a blonde wig, and when disturbed by the portrayal of child abuse, Spielberg did not require her to perform the take again. For her work on the film, O'Rourke earned between $35,000 and $100,000. Poltergeist would go on to receive a cult following and critical acclaim, garnering three Academy Award nominations and a Young Artist Award nomination for O'Rourke. She was lauded for her performance, with The New York Times noting that she played a key role, writing that "With her wide eyes, long blonde hair and soft voice, she was so striking that the sequel played off her presence." Her delivery of the lines "They're here!" in the first film, and "They're baa-aack!" in the second (that film's tagline), placed her in the collective pop culture consciousness of the United States. "They're here!" is ranked No. 69 on the American Film Institute's list of 100 Movie Quotes, and PopSugar included the line on their list of "100 Greatest Movie Quotes".

After her work in Poltergeist (1982), O'Rourke secured several television and TV movie roles. In April 1983, she starred as herself alongside Morey Amsterdam and well-known Walt Disney animated characters in the hour-long television special, Believe You Can...and You Can! She also appeared in CHiPs, Webster, The New Leave It to Beaver, Our House, and had a recurring role on Happy Days as Heather Pfister. For Webster, O'Rourke won her first Young Artist Award. She also appeared in the television movies Massarati and the Brain and Surviving: A Family in Crisis. O'Rourke went on to reprise the role of Carol Anne Freeling in the second and third installments, Poltergeist II: The Other Side in 1986 and Poltergeist III in 1988 respectively; unlike its predecessor, the films garnered mixed reviews, although O'Rourke's performances were praised. Poltergeist III was her final feature, released in June 1988, four months after her death.

 Illness and death 
In early 1987, O'Rourke became ill with giardiasis, which she contracted from well water at her family's home in Big Bear Lake. She was subsequently diagnosed as having Crohn's disease. She was prescribed cortisone injections to treat the disease during the time she was filming Poltergeist III. The steroidal injections resulted in facial swelling of the cheeks, which O'Rourke's mother said she was very self-conscious about.
On January 31, 1988, O'Rourke began exhibiting flu-like symptoms. The following morning, she collapsed in her home, and was rushed to Community Hospital in El Cajon. En route, she suffered cardiac arrest, but paramedics were able to restart her heart at 9:25a.m. She was subsequently flown to the Children's Hospital of San Diego, where it was discovered she had intestinal stenosis and went into emergency surgery. She survived the surgery, but suffered another cardiac arrest while in the recovery room. Doctors performed CPR for over 30 minutes, but O'Rourke was pronounced dead at 2:43 that afternoon. O'Rourke's cause of death was ruled congenital stenosis of the intestine complicated by septic shock.

Daniel Hollander, the head of gastroenterology at the University of California, Irvine Medical Center stated that O'Rourke's death was "distinctly unusual" as she lacked prior symptoms of the bowel defect: "I would have expected a lot of [digestive] difficulties throughout her life and not just to have developed a problem all of a sudden." However, Dr. Hollander further stated that it was possible for congenital bowel narrowing to cause sudden death without symptoms if an infection caused the bowel to rupture. A private funeral was held for O'Rourke on February 5 in Los Angeles, and she was entombed at Westwood Village Memorial Park Cemetery.

 Filmography 
 Film 

 Television 

 Accolades 

 Awards and nominations 
O'Rourke was nominated for a collective six Young Artist Awards, one of which was won for her performance on the series Webster in 1985.

 Honors 
 On the American Film Institute's 2005 list of "100 Movie Quotes", O'Rourke's delivery of "They're here!" in Poltergeist is ranked No. 69.
 On PopSugar's 2021 list of "100 Greatest Movie Quotes", O'Rourke's delivery of "They're here!" in Poltergeist'' is listed.

References

Sources

External links 

 
 

1975 births
1988 deaths
20th-century American actresses
Actresses from California
Actresses from San Diego
American child actresses
American film actresses
American television actresses
Burials at Westwood Village Memorial Park Cemetery
Deaths from digestive disease
Deaths from sepsis
People from Anaheim, California
People from Big Bear Lake, California
People from Lakeside, California